Micro Mages is a platform game for the Nintendo Entertainment System that was published on April 30, 2019 by Morphcat Games. The game raised over 150,000 Euros on Kickstarter. The game was published as a physical cartridge for the NES, and later as a digital download, bundled with an emulator, on Steam and Itch.io.

Development
The game was developed to fit within 40 kilobytes, the size that all games published when the NES was released, such as Super Mario Bros., had to fit into (later development techniques allowed larger games, such as Super Mario Bros. 3). The game was written in 6502 assembly language. 8 kilobytes of cartridge space was reserved for graphics, while the remaining 32 kilobytes were used for game code. Graphics were reused across levels and animations to save space. The game was written with the goal of creating an expansive multi-player game with the same limitations that the first NES developers experienced.

References

External links

2019 video games
Nintendo Entertainment System games
Nintendo Entertainment System-only games
Homebrew software
Kickstarter-funded video games
Platform games
Video games about witchcraft
Video games developed in Germany